The following shows the public housing estates in Diamond Hill, Wong Tai Sin District, Kowloon, Hong Kong.

History

Overview

Fung Chuen Court 

Fung Chuen Court is a Home Ownership Scheme court in Diamond Hill, near Fung Tak Estate. It has one block built in 1991.

Fung Lai Court 

Fung Lai Court is a Home Ownership Scheme court in Diamond Hill, near Fung Tak Estate. It has two blocks built in 1997.

Fung Tak Estate 

Fung Tak Estate is a public housing estate and Tenants Purchase Scheme estate in Diamond Hill, near Lung Poon Court, Plaza Hollywood, Galaxia and MTR Diamond Hill station. It has 7 blocks built in 1991. It is named from nearby Fung Tak Road. In 1998, some of the flats were sold to tenants through Tenants Purchase Scheme Phase 1.

Education
Lung Poon Court is in Primary One Admission (POA) School Net 45. Within the school net are multiple aided schools (operated independently but funded with government money); no government primary schools are in this net.

See also
 List of public housing estates in Hong Kong

References 

Diamond Hill
Wong Tai Sin District